Olaeis was a town of ancient Caria. The name is not attested but is inferred from epigraphic and other evidence. It was a polis (city-state) and a member of the Delian League.

References

Populated places in ancient Caria
Former populated places in Turkey
Greek city-states
Members of the Delian League
History of Muğla Province